Kennett High School is the only public high school in the Kennett Consolidated School District and is located in Kennett Square, Pennsylvania, United States. The school averages around 1300 students and 100 faculty members. The Kennett Consolidated School District Office is located next to the high school.

Campus

The school is located just south of the small town of Kennett Square. Recent major renovations were completed in 2006, including the construction of a new science wing.  The high school's new stadium was completed in the summer of 2007 as well as the renovation to the baseball and soccer fields, and the addition of a new concession stand. As part of the renovations, the previously adjacent Kennett Middle School was relocated to Landenberg, Pennsylvania, in a newly constructed building of its own.

Extracurricular activities

Kennett offers the following sports programs: Golf, Cross Country (Boys and Girls), Soccer (Boys and Girls), Field Hockey, Volleyball, Tennis (Boys and Girls), Football, Ice Hockey, Wrestling, Basketball (Boys and Girls), Winter Track (Boys and Girls), Swimming (Boys and Girls), Cheerleading, Baseball, Softball, Lacrosse (Boys and Girls), and Track (Boys and Girls)

Both football and the marching band were brought back in the 2005–2006 school year after being absent from the district for many years. 2011-12 Kennett football program recorded their first non-losing season, as varsity finished with a 6–6 record.

During the 2001–2002 season, the KHS Basketball team was the Pennsylvania AAA State Basketball champion.

During the 2018–2019 season, the KHS Boys Swim team were the Ches-Mont League American Division Champions.

Kennett's chapter of the Pennsylvania Future Business Leaders of America is the largest in the region, one of the ten largest in the state, and one of the 100 largest in the nation.

In 2015, the Kennett Marching Band won first place in the Cavalcade of Bands A Class Championships.

Music students at Kennett have also participated in the Pennsylvania Music Educators Association district, region, and state festivals for band, chorus, and orchestra.

References

External links
 KHS Official Site
Alumni Website
Kennett Marching Band Official Website
www.publicschoolreview.com
www.greatschools.net

Public high schools in Pennsylvania
Educational institutions established in 1921
Schools in Chester County, Pennsylvania
1921 establishments in Pennsylvania
Kennett Square, Pennsylvania